Ann Li was the defending champion but chose to compete at the 2021 Courmayeur Ladies Open instead.

Misaki Doi won the title, defeating Harriet Dart in the final, 7–6(7–5), 6–2.

Seeds

Draw

Finals

Top half

Bottom half

References

Main Draw

Christus Health Pro Challenge - Singles